The double-charm tetraquark (T, cc) is a type of long-lived tetraquark that was discovered in 2021 in the LHCb experiment conducted at the Large Hadron Collider. It contains four quarks: two charm quarks, an anti-up and an anti-down quark.

The discovery showed an exceptionally strong peak, with 20-sigma significance.

It is hypothesized that studying the behavior of the double-charm tetraquark may play a part in explaining the behavior of the strong force. Following the discovery of the T, researchers now plan experiments to find its double-beauty counterpart T. This tetraquark has been found to have a longer lifespan than most known exotic-matter particles.

References

External links 
 Observation and study of the doubly charmed Tcc+ tetraquark at LHCb: presentation by Ivan Polyaokov at CERN, 2021-09-14

Hadrons
Mesons
Large Hadron Collider
2021 in science
Subatomic particles with spin 1